Sergio Giral (born 2 January 1937) is a Cuban-American film writer and director. He was raised in New York City, as an aspiring young painter in the days of the Beatnik generation.

In 1962, Oscar-winning cinematographer Nestor Almendros invited Giral to work together at the ICAIC (The Cuban Film Institute). It was there, after a series of shorts and documentaries, that Giral filmed a trilogy (The Other Francisco, Rancheador and Maluala) about slavery in 19th Century Cuba and the Caribbean.  The Other Francisco was entered into the 9th Moscow International Film Festival where it won a Diploma.

In 1991 Giral returned to the United States. He resides in Miami. Dos Veces Ana was his first feature film made in USA.

Filmography

See also
 Cinema of Cuba

References

External links

1937 births
Living people
Cuban film directors